Entagen is an American software company founded in 2008 by Christopher Bouton. It develops software for big data integration and analytics. Entagen was purchased by Thomson Reuters in 2013.

History
Entagen was founded by Christopher Bouton in 2008. Entagen's technologies were named "Innovative Technology of the Year in Big Data" in 2012 by the Massachusetts Technology Leadership Council  and Entagen was named a Gartner "Cool Vendor" in the Life Sciences in 2013.

Entagen was acquired by Thomson Reuters in October, 2013 for an undisclosed amount.

Corporate structure
According to Entagen, a portion of Entagen's employees were based at its Minneapolis facility where its software engineering division is located while headquarters, systems architecture and data sciences groups were located in the Boston area.

Products and services
According to Entagen, it develops data integration and analytics software products including TripleMap  and Extera. Following the acquisition of Entagen by Thomson Reuters, Entagen technologies were incorporated into the Cortellis family of products.

References

External links
 

Defunct software companies of the United States
2008 establishments in Massachusetts
Software companies established in 2008
Companies based in Boston
Software companies disestablished in 2013
2013 disestablishments in Massachusetts